Andover is a rural town in Tolland County, Connecticut, United States, roughly 10 miles West of Hartford. The population was 3,151 at the 2020 census. Andover is home to Andover Elementary School for grades K–6 while grades 7–12 go to R.H.A.M. middle and high schools. Andover elementary scores above average on standardized testing and student development as well as having a notably low student to teacher ratio of 8:1.

History

Andover was incorporated on May 18, 1848, from Hebron and Coventry. The name is a transfer from Andover, Hampshire, England.

Geography

A number of small streams and rivers flow in Andover, among which are the Hop River, Burnap Brook, Skungamaug River, and Straddle Brook. Andover Lake is located in the Southeast Corner of town.

Demographics

As of the 2010 United States Census Andover had a population of 3,304.  The racial composition of the population was 95.9% white, 1.1% black or African American, 0.1% Native American, 1.1% Asian, 0.5% from some other race and 1.2% reporting two or more race.  1.6% of the population was Hispanic or Latino of any race.

At the 2000 census there were 3,036 people, 1,150 households, and 861 families living in the town. The racial makeup of the town was 96.64% White, 0.92% African American, 0.33% Native American, 0.46% Asian, 0.69% from other races, and 0.96% from two or more races. Hispanic or Latino of any race were 1.55%.

Of the 1,150 households 37.5% had children under the age of 18 living with them, 64.3% were married couples living together, 8.0% had a female householder with no husband present, and 25.1% were non-families. 19.0% of households were one person and 5.6% were one person aged 65 or older.  The average household size was 2.64 and the average family size was 3.04.

The age distribution was 27.3% under the age of 18, 4.3% from 18 to 24, 34.9% from 25 to 44, 25.7% from 45 to 64, and 7.7% 65 or older.  The median age was 38 years. For every 100 females, there were 102.1 males.  For every 100 females age 18 and over, there were 98.2 males.

The median household income was $92,822, and the median family income  was $45,234. Males had a median income of $21,543 versus $18,167 for females. The per capita income for the town was $30,273.  About 2.3% of families and 3.6% of the population were below the poverty line, including 2.8% of those under age 18 and 4.8% of those age 65 or over.

Infrastructure 
Route 6 runs roughly Northwest-Southeast through the center of town, connecting Andover to the nearby communities of Windham and Bolton. There is also a library in Andover. Originally opened in 1896, in the Congregational Church Conference House, it was relocated in 1927 to its present location on Long Hill Road.

Points of interest

Andover Veterans Monument Park is located on Monument Lane in front of the Museum of Andover History. The Agent Orange Monument in memory of those who died because of Agent Orange during the Vietnam war was unveiled on June 5, 2021 at the Andover Veterans Monument Park.
Museum of Andover History is located in the Old Town Hall on Monument Lane. It traces the history of Andover since 1600.

Politics

Voter registration

Election results

References

External links

 Town of Andover
 Museum of Andover History

 
Towns in Tolland County, Connecticut
Populated places established in 1848
Towns in Connecticut
Greater Hartford